House of Versace is a 2013 Canadian biographical drama television film directed by Sara Sugarman and starring Gina Gershon. Based on the 2010 biography House of Versace: The Untold Story of Genius, Murder, and Survival by Deborah Ball, it depicts real-life events of the Versace family, and particularly designer Donatella Versace inheriting the Versace fashion house following the murder of her brother Gianni.

Plot
The film is about Italian fashion designer and company founder Gianni Versace. When Gianni is shot dead in front of his villa "Casa Casuarina" in Miami at the age of 50, his two siblings, Donatella and Santo, have to take over the management of the company. Donatella has been using drugs since then and is about to go bankrupt. With the help of her relatives, she is transferred to a rehabilitation center and comes back clean and healthy again. It leads the company to one of the most influential fashion brands in the world.

Cast
 Gina Gershon as Donatella Versace
 Enrico Colantoni as Gianni Versace
 Colm Feore as Santo Versace
 Donna Murphy as Maria
 Alex Carter as Paul Beck
 Samantha Hodhod  as Allegra Versace
 Stefano DiMatteo as Antonio D'Amico
 Yan England as Michael
 Raquel Welch as Aunt Lucia
 Trevor Momesso as Daniel Versace
 Mylène Dinh-Robic as Amanda
 Jayne Heitmeyer as Lauren
 Luke Morrison as Andrew Cunanan

References

External links
 

2013 television films
2013 films
2013 biographical drama films
Biographical television films
Canadian biographical drama films
Drama films based on actual events
American drama television films
English-language Canadian films
Films about drugs
Films about fashion designers
Films about murder
Films based on biographies
Lifetime (TV network) films
Versace
2010s American films
2010s Canadian films
Films about companies
2010s English-language films